Sattari Constituency was one of the 30 Goa Legislative Assembly constituencies of the state of Goa in southern India. Sattari was also one of the constituencies falling under the North Goa Lok Sabha constituency.

Members of Goa Legislative Assembly

Notes

References

Former assembly constituencies of Goa
North Goa district